Kevin Huber (born July 16, 1985) is an American football punter who is a free agent. He played college football at Cincinnati, where he was a two-time consensus All-American, before being drafted by the Bengals in the fifth round of the 2009 NFL Draft.

Early years
Huber was born in Cincinnati, Ohio.  He attended Immaculate Heart of Mary in Cincinnati for grade school and then attended Archbishop McNicholas High School in Cincinnati, and played for the McNicholas Rockets high school football team. He was a three-time all-conference selection and was named the Greater Catholic League's Punter of the Year following his junior and senior seasons.

College career
Huber attended the University of Cincinnati, where he played for the Cincinnati Bearcats football team from 2005 to 2008. As a junior in 2007, and again as a senior in 2008, he was recognized as a consensus first-team All-American. Huber holds the record for longest punt in Bearcats' history at 69 yards, which was set on September 17, 2007 at Memphis.

Awards and honors
2007 first-team All-American (AP, WCFF, Sporting News)
2007 Big East Special Teams Player of the Year
2008 first-team All-American (Rivals.com, AFCA FWAA SI.com)

Professional career

The Cincinnati Bengals selected Huber in the fifth round with the 142nd overall pick in the 2009 NFL Draft, and he has played for the Bengals since the  season. In his 13-year career, through Week 13 (Nov. 28) of the 2021 season, Huber has played 201 games and averaged 45.3 yards on 955 punts. He has also been the Bengals' placekicking holder for his entire career.

In Week 15 of  against the Pittsburgh Steelers, Huber suffered a fractured jaw when he was blocked by linebacker Terence Garvin. It was reported that Huber had also suffered a vertebral fracture in his neck, and would miss the remainder of the season.NFL head of officials Dean Blandino was critical of Ed Hochuli's officiating crew Tuesday night, saying it got the play wrong. Garvin's hit wasn't clean by rule and should have been deemed illegal. Garvin was subsequently fined $25,000.

Huber holds Bengals' franchise career marks for gross punting average (44.2 yards) and net average (39.1) through the 2013 season, as well as the season records in both categories (set in 2012).

On March 14, 2018, Huber signed a three-year contract extension with the Bengals. On March 22, 2021, Huber re-signed on a one-year contract with the Bengals.

Huber signed a one-year contract with the Bengals on May 2, 2022.

On December 5, 2022 Huber was officially released from the Bengals after 14 seasons and starting 216 games (a franchise record.) He was re-signed to the team's practice squad two days later.

NFL career statistics

Personal life
Huber has been married since 2017.

References

External links
Cincinnati Bengals bio

1985 births
Living people
All-American college football players
American football punters
Cincinnati Bearcats football players
Cincinnati Bengals players
Players of American football from Cincinnati
Unconferenced Pro Bowl players